K-249, also known as Southwest Boulevard, is a  north–south state highway located entirely within Greenwood County in the U.S. state of Kansas. K-249's southern terminus is at K-99 just outside the City of Madison, and the northern terminus is at K-58 in Madison. K-249 was originally a section of K-99 before it was realigned to the west of the city.

Route description
K-249's southern terminus is at an intersection with K-99 just south of Madison. The highway travels north along the Madison city line as Southwest Boulevard. The highway reaches an intersection with McCurry Street, where it enters the city. K-249 continues north past an intersection with Elm Street before curving slightly northeast. The highway curves back north and reaches its northern terminus at K-58, known as 4th Street and West Lincoln Street.

The Kansas Department of Transportation (KDOT) tracks the traffic levels on its highways. On K-249 in 2020, they determined that on average the traffic was 570 vehicles per day on K-249. The entire length of K-249 is two-lanes and maintained by KDOT. K-249 is not included in the National Highway System. The National Highway System is a system of highways important to the nation's defense, economy, and mobility.

History
In December 1961, the Kansas State Highway Commission, now known as KDOT, announced a project to reroute K-99 to the west of Madison. The project was needed to bring K-99 above the 25-year flood level and eliminate several curves. The section of K-99 and K-57 from Madison Avenue north out of the city would be abandoned, and instead K-57 would follow Madison Avenue west to the new alignment of K-99. The section of K-99 from Madison south to the new alignment would be assigned a new route number. In Mid July 1964, bids were taken for the new bypass.

The highway was first designated as K-249 in a resolution approved on June 12, 1963. This resolution was updated in a resolution approved on February 11, 1964. In late August 1964, work began on the new bypass route. The roughly $1 million (equivalent to $ in  dollars) bypass opened to traffic on November 3, 1965. In a resolution approved on September 20, 2004, by Secretary of Transportation Deb Miller, K-57's eastern terminus was truncated to end at K-4 in Dwight. The former section from K-99 east to east to US-169 was renumbered, making K-249's northern terminus K-58.

Major intersections

Notes

References

External links

Kansas Department of Transportation State Map
KDOT: Historic State Maps

249
Transportation in Greenwood County, Kansas
State highways in the United States shorter than one mile